The Beavis and Butt-Head Experience is a compilation album released in 1993 by Geffen Records and related to the animated television series Beavis and Butt-Head. The name is a reference to Jimi Hendrix's original band, The Jimi Hendrix Experience. It is one of the best selling comedy albums and has sold 1,610,000 units as of May 2014. It was certified double platinum by the RIAA in the United States.

Overview
The album features genres of hard rock, heavy metal, and hip-hop. Many of the songs are intercut with commentary by Beavis and Butt-Head. They are joined by Cher on a cover of "I Got You Babe", the music video which featured Beavis and Butt-Head meeting a live-action Cher via computer-generated imagery. Beavis and Butt-Head also performed the slow jam "Come to Butt-Head".

The album contains a hidden track. After a period of silence following "I Got You Babe", a reprise of "Come to Butt-Head" starts at 5:08, in which Beavis and Butt-Head are joined by rapper Positive K.

"I Got You Babe" with Cher was released as a single internationally and had chart success in Australia, Belgium, Denmark, Europe, Netherlands, Sweden, US and the UK and featured a music video which would rotate on MTV and MTV Europe. The song "Come to Butt-Head" was also released as a single in Germany.

In 2016, the album was reissued as a vinyl picture disc.

Liner notes

The album's liner notes featured drawings of Beavis and Butt-Head adapted as a variety of other characters, including hippies, old women, Hasidic Jews, and Captain Picard and Commander Riker of the television series Star Trek: The Next Generation.

The title of the track "Mental Masturbation" by Jackyl is censored on the track listing, appearing as "Mental *@%#!" on the inner liner notes and "Mental ★@%#!" on the back cover.

Track listing

[*] Contains the hidden track "Come to Butt-Head (Reprise)" by Beavis and Butt-Head featuring Positive K at 5:08.

Charts

Certifications

References

Beavis and Butt-head Experience, The
Albums produced by Steve Albini
Alternative rock compilation albums
1993 debut albums
Articles containing video clips
Beavis and Butt-Head
Comedy rock compilation albums
Hard rock compilation albums
Heavy metal compilation albums
Television soundtracks